Giovanni Gozzi (19 October 1902 – 11 August 1976) was an Italian Olympic champion in Greco-Roman wrestling.

Gozzi competed at the 1932 Summer Olympics in Los Angeles where he won a gold medal in the featherweight class. He also won a bronze medal at the 1928 Summer Olympics and competed at the 1924 Summer Olympics. He was selected for the 1936 Games, but missed it because of an accident.

At the European championships Gozzi won a gold medal in 1927 in bantamweight, a silver in 1925 in bantamweight, and a bronze in 1934 in featherweight. After retiring from competitions he worked as a wrestling coach.

References

External links
 

1902 births
1976 deaths
Sportspeople from Milan
Olympic wrestlers of Italy
Wrestlers at the 1924 Summer Olympics
Wrestlers at the 1928 Summer Olympics
Wrestlers at the 1932 Summer Olympics
Italian male sport wrestlers
Olympic gold medalists for Italy
Olympic bronze medalists for Italy
Olympic medalists in wrestling
Medalists at the 1928 Summer Olympics
Medalists at the 1932 Summer Olympics
20th-century Italian people